South of the Rio Grande is a 1932 American pre-Code Western film directed by Lambert Hillyer and starring Buck Jones. A copy is preserved in the Library of Congress collection.

Cast
 Buck Jones - Sergeant Carlos Olivarez (as Charles 'Buck' Jones)
 Mona Maris - Consuela Delgado
 George J. Lewis - Corporal Ramon Ruiz (as George Lewis)
 Doris Hill - Dolores Ruiz
 Philo McCullough - Clark (as Philo McCollough)
 Paul Fix - Juan Olivarez
 James Durkin - Senor Ruiz
 Charles Stevens - Pedro
 Charles Requa - Andres (uncredited)
 Harry Semels - Bandido Leader (uncredited)
 Charles Brinley - Manuel (uncredited)
 Joe Dominguez - Bandido (uncredited)
 Al Haskell - Bandido (uncredited)
 Edward LeSaint - Mayor (uncredited)
 Merrill McCormick - Perdido (uncredited)
 Silver - Carlos' Horse (uncredited)

References

External links
  South of the Rio Grande at IMDb.com
 

1932 films
1932 Western (genre) films
American black-and-white films
American Western (genre) films
Columbia Pictures films
Films directed by Lambert Hillyer
1930s American films